Rot-Weiß Oberhausen is a German association football club in Oberhausen, North Rhine-Westphalia. The club was formed as Oberhausener SV in December 1904 out of the merger of Emschertaler SV (1902) and the football enthusiasts of Oberhausener TV 1873. The new side entered into a union with Viktoria Styrum BV to create SpVgg 1904 Oberhausen-Styrum, but within six months a number of the club's members left to form 1. FC Mülheim-Styrum. The remaining club members carried on and in 1934 took on their current name.

History

The team was unremarked through its early history, simply playing local ball. After the re-organization of German football in the early 1930s under the Third Reich Rot Weiss played in the Gauliga Niederrhein but could never match the strength of division rival Fortuna Düsseldorf. During World War II the club played alongside ASV Elmar as part of the combined wartime side KSG Elmar/Viktoria Oberhausen.

The club worked its way into the upper league Oberliga West after the war and with the formation of the Bundesliga, Germany's new professional circuit, found themselves in the second division Regionalliga West. A first-place finish there in 1969 led to promotion to the Bundesliga for the workmanlike side. The club's turn in the top flight was tainted when they were implicated in the Bundesliga bribery scandal of 1971. While it was clear they were involved, the club and its players escaped sanction. After three years in the upper league without doing any better than a 14th-place finish, the club returned to its existence as a tier II and III side.

Financial problems in 1988 were the prelude to a slide into the Verbandsliga Niederrhein (IV) two years later. After nearly a decade spent bouncing up and down between the third and fourth divisions Die Kleeblätter returned to the 2. Bundesliga in 1998, winning the Regionalliga West/Südwest. They remained a lower table side for the most part, but did manage to put forward their best ever performances with sixth and fifth-place finishes in 2000 and 2004. Oberhausen was relegated again to the Regionalliga Nord (III) for 2005. Relegation to the Oberliga (IV) followed a year later. They returned to 2. Bundesliga after two successively promotions; which were first in the Oberliga Nordrhein in 2006–07 and second of Regionalliga Nord in 2007–08 season. The club dropped out of the 2. Bundesliga in 2011, was relegated again the following year from the 3. Liga and now plays in the tier four Regionalliga West.

Honours
The club's honours:
 Regionalliga West
 Champions: 1969
 Oberliga Nordrhein
 Champions: 1979, 1983, 1995, 2007
 Verbandsliga Niederrhein
 Champions: 1993
 Lower Rhine Cup
 Winners: 1996, 1998, 2018

Recent seasons
The club's recent seasons:

Key

Players

Current squad

Famous players and successes

Rot-Weiß Oberhausen has seen three of its players capped for Germany.

The club's 1970–71 Bundesliga season was distinguished by the performance of Lothar Kobluhn, who won the league scoring title with 24 goals – 12 of those coming in the last 8 games of the season to save Rot-Weiß from relegation by just one goal. The team was embroiled in the Bundesliga scandal of 1971 and as a result Kobluhn was not awarded the Torjägerkanone trophy as top-scorer until October 2007, 36 years after his achievement.

In 1999, Oberhausen played a DFB-Pokal semifinal in Gelsenkirchen against Bayern Munich in front of 45,000 spectators, losing 1–3. On their way to their semifinal appearance they beat Borussia Mönchengladbach and Hamburger SV.

In July 2010, midfielder Heinrich Schmidtgal was selected for the national team of Kazakhstan and played his first international match in Kazakhstan's Euro 2012 qualification against Turkey on 3 September 2010.

Managers
  Slobodan Cendic (1985–1986)
  Janos Bedl (1986–1987)
  Hans-Werner Moors (1987–1988)
  Gerd vom Bruch (1997–1998)
  Aleksandar Ristić (1998–2000)
  Gerhard Kleppinger (2000–2001)
  Dragoslav Stepanović (2001)
  Aleksandar Ristic (2001–2003)
  Klaus Hilpert (2003)
  Jørn Andersen (2003–2004)
  Jürgen Luginger (2004, caretaker)
  Eugen Hach (2004–2005)
  Harry Pleß (2005–2006)
  Günter Abel (2006)
  Hans-Günter Bruns (2006–2008)
  Jürgen Luginger (2008–2010)
  Hans-Günter Bruns (2010–2011)
  Theo Schneider (2011)
  Mario Basler (2011–2012)
  Peter Kunkel (2012–2014)
  Andreas Zimmermann (2014–2016)
  Mike Terranova (2016–2020)
  Dimitrios Pappas (2020)
  Mike Terranova (2020–)

Athletics
Rot-Weiß Oberhausen has also had an athletics section. Among its most prominent former members are Willi Wülbeck and Fritz Roderfeld. The team also became national champions in 4 x 400 metres relay in 1948 and 3 x 1000 metres relay in 1951.

References

External links

Official club site

 
Football clubs in Germany
Football clubs in North Rhine-Westphalia
Athletics clubs in Germany
Oberhausen
Association football clubs established in 1904
1904 establishments in Germany
Bundesliga clubs
2. Bundesliga clubs
3. Liga clubs